The 1980 United States Senate election in Ohio took place on November 4, 1980. It was concurrent with elections to the United States House of Representatives. Incumbent Democratic U.S Senator John Glenn won re-election to a second term in a landslide with 69% of the vote, coinciding with Ronald Reagan's substantial win in the state during the presidential election. Glenn won by a state-record 1.6 million votes.

General election

Candidates 
 Jim Betts, State Representative (Republican)
 John Glenn, incumbent U.S. Senator (Democratic)
Rick Nagin (Independent)
John E. Powers (Independent)

Results

See also 
 1980 United States Senate elections

References 

Ohio
1980
1980 Ohio elections
John Glenn